Alcides Mañay (born 18 January 1927) was a Uruguayan footballer. He played in one match for the Uruguay national football team in 1945. He was also part of Uruguay's squad for the 1946 South American Championship.

References

External links
 

1927 births
Possibly living people
Uruguayan footballers
Uruguay international footballers
Association football midfielders
Defensor Sporting players
Cúcuta Deportivo footballers
AS Cannes players
Uruguayan expatriate footballers
Expatriate footballers in Colombia
Expatriate footballers in France